Škrljevo Castle (Slovenian: Grad Škrljevo german: Grailach) is a castle in Carniola, present day municilpality of Šentrupert, Slovenia.

History 
According to the Slovenian historian Milko Kos (1892–1972), it is said to have been mentioned for the first time in 1043. With reference to Father Martinus Bautscherus, Valvasor attributes the foundation of the castle to St. Hemma. Valvasor already complained about the scant news when he wrote: "How much I searched diligently at what time and by whom this castle was first built and inhabited: I have neither the old writings nor documents, much less the authors, can give some news of this with the exception of Father Bautscherus."

The Jesuit Bautscher, a contemporary of Valvasor, left a message written in Latin, from which it emerges that St. Hemma, among other goods, also brought the Grailach rule into the marriage: "[...] dotem attulit comitatum Peilnstein, castra Vizel, Landsberg, Weitenstein, Andernacum, Nassenfues, Grailach, Erkhenstein, ac alia praedia in Carniola sita [...]. "

According to Hemma's donation (1043), these goods belonged to the Benedictine monastery she founded on the Gurk in Carinthia until 1072 and then to the Gurk diocese, which the Grailach lordship gave as a fief in the 17th century.

The first mention of the village of Škrljevo dates back to 1043, when the village was mentioned as Chrilouva. As an estate, Škrljevo was first mentioned in 1130 as the predium Chrilowe. From 1072 until the 17th century, the castle was a feud of the Krka diocese in Carinthia.

The castle was originally built as a towering court, and its estate was later granted to Count William II. Breže-Selško, and after his death his wife Hemma of Gurk donated this property to the Krško diocese. The court was first mentioned indirectly in 1163, when a document mentions the knight of Škrljevo and the minister of Aquileia, Majnhard Škrljevski (purchrauiis Megnardo de Crilog). The direct connection with Hemma of Gurk, which Valvasor claims was the owner of the castle in the 10th century, has not yet been proven, but it is highly probable.

In 1541, Škrljevo Castle passed into the possession of the Auerspergs, and from 1585 a document appears in which Janez Baltazar Wernegk is mentioned as the owner.

The castle is Romanesque in its core, it was extended in the Renaissance and became a fortified mansion, later in the Gothic period it was partially rebuilt. In the Baroque period a façade was added, which is still visible today.

Owner 

According to the current state of research, no news about the owners of the castle and the Grailach rule are known until the middle of the 16th century.

The brothers Adam and Sigismund von Auersperg are mentioned as the first names for the Grailach rule in 1541. This was followed in 1585 by Johann Balthasar von Werneck, until 1613 by Rudolph Count Barbo von Wachsenstein and Ruess von Ruessenstein (1613). His successor as owner from 1613 to 1705 Martin Khaysell, followed by the Barons von Langenmantel until 1785. The owners were then the Barons von Pittoni (1785 to 1799), the Schuller family (1799 to 1834), and Karl Vasič from 1834 to 1885who was the administrator of Auersperg, and since 1885 Podobnik.

Tumulus 
In the forest west of Škrljevo Castle, tumulus from the Early Iron Age with diameters of 15 m and 12 m and heights of 2 m and 1.5 m were discovered. A smaller burial is visible to the northwest of the smaller mound. Both were excavated in 1905 by J. Pečnik but there weren't any finds.

References

Castles in Slovenia